Callicarpa pedunculata  (common name - velvet-leaf) is a shrub or small tree in the Lamiaceae family native to both Queensland and New South Wales.

Description 
C. pedunculata is a shrub or small tree growing from 3 to 4 m high.

The twigs, the petioles and the underside of the leaf blade have a covering of  stalked stellate hairs,  while the upper surface of the leaf  has a covering of stellate and simple hairs which become sparse when older. The Leaf blades  are about 6-18 x 3-6 cm, and there are small, pale yellow, glands on the underside of the leaf. The bottom part of the leaf has smooth margins but the remainder is toothed.

The inflorescences  are 2 to 3 cm long, and sometimes inserted a little above leaf axil. The flowers have stalks which are 0.5 to 1 mm long, while the calyx 1 to 1.5 mm long, and the purple or mauve corolla  is 2 to 3 mm long.

It produces whitish to purple berries that are drupes.

It is grown as an ornamental shrub. The fruit is astringent and too acidic to be eaten by people.

It was first described by Robert Brown in 1810.

References

External links
 Callicarpa pedunculata database

pedunculata
Taxa named by Robert Brown (botanist, born 1773)